The Karma News is an Indian digital news platform based in Kerala. It was founded by  Vince Mathew  in 2014. Apart from Kerala, it also has bureaus in the states of  Tamil Nadu and Karnataka. It is operated under the aegis of The Karma Media  Private Limited, which is an Indian Company registered under the Companies Act 2013.

History
Karma News, being a new media digital platform primarily publishes its news stories on its website with majority of coverage in the Malayalam language. The platform additionally has an English language edition of the website as well. The news coverage is divided into factual news reporting and opinion pieces.

References

External links

Indian States & Capitals List

Indian news websites
Watchdog journalism
News media in India